Street Without Joy (French: La rue sans joie) is a 1938 French drama film directed by André Hugon and starring Dita Parlo, Albert Préjean and Marguerite Deval. It is a remake of the 1925 German film The Joyless Street directed by Georg Wilhelm Pabst.

Synopsis
A young woman tries to financially support her family amidst the poverty of Paris.

Cast
 Dita Parlo as Jeanne de Romer  
 Albert Préjean as Jean Dumas  
 Marguerite Deval as Le greffier  
 Line Noro as Marie Leichner  
 Valéry Inkijinoff as Louis Stinner  
 Pierre Alcover as Monsieur Antoine  
 Henri Bosc as L'avocat de Stinner  
 Fréhel as Henriette  
 Jean Périer as Le grand-père 
 Charlotte Barbier-Krauss as La mère de Jeanne  
 Émile Drain as Le président  
 Mila Parély as Léa Level  
 Jean d'Yd as L'avocat général  
 Janine Guise as La détective  
 Jean Mercure as Le petit pâtissier  
 Elisa Ruis as Régine Rozès  
 Guy Rapp as Inspecteur Varnier  
 Claude Roy as Le petit frère de Jeanne  
 Francine Dartois as La soeur de Jeanne  
 Paul Pauley as Monsieur Woss

References

Bibliography 
 Crisp, Colin. French Cinema—A Critical Filmography: Volume 1, 1929-1939. Indiana University Press, 2015.

External links 
 

1938 films
French drama films
1938 drama films
1930s French-language films
Films directed by André Hugon
Films set in Paris
Films based on Austrian novels
Remakes of German films
Sound film remakes of silent films
French black-and-white films
1930s French films